Barbatula namiri is a species of ray-finned fish in the family Balitoridae. It is found in Lebanon, Syria, and Turkey. Its natural habitat is rivers. It is found in the Orontes River watershed and coastal rivers of Lebanon and Syria north of southern Nahr al-Kabir al-Janoubi. It is threatened by habitat loss by water extraction and dams and pollution in Turkey; threats in Lebanon and Syria are unknown. The population is unknown but is considered stable in Turkey.

References 

namiri
Fish described in 1991
Taxonomy articles created by Polbot